Fyodor Isidorovich Kuznetsov (29 September 1898 – 22 March 1961) was a  Colonel General and military commander in the Soviet Union.

Biography
Born to a peasant family in Mogilev Governorate (present-day Horki Raion, Mogilev Oblast of Belarus), Kuznetsov served in the Imperial Russian Army during World War I and continued his service in the Bolsheviks' Red Army. During the German-Soviet War, he initially commanded the Northwestern Front during the Baltic Strategic Defensive Operation until 30 June 1941, but was relieved in early August 1941 (replaced by General Major Pyotr Sobennikov). At a Stavka session on 12 August 1941, he was given command of the new 51st Independent Army, but he was replaced by Pavel Batov in October 1941 during the defense of the Crimea. Later he served as the temporary commander of the Central Front (July–August 1941), Chief of Staff of the 28th Army, Deputy Commander of the Western Front, and commander of the 61st Army.

From March 1942 to June 1943, he served as the commanding officer of the Academy of General Staff, and from August 1943 to February 1944 as the Deputy Commander of the Volkhov Front and Karelian Front. From 1945-1948, he commanded the Ural Military District, retiring due to illness.

He is buried in the Novodevichy Cemetery in Moscow.

References

Erickson, The Road to Stalingrad, 2003 Cassel Military Paperbacks edition, p. 198-9, 256

1898 births
1961 deaths
People from Horki District
People from Chaussky Uyezd
Communist Party of the Soviet Union members
Soviet colonel generals
Imperial Russian Army officers
Russian military personnel of World War I
Soviet military personnel of the Russian Civil War
Soviet military personnel of the Winter War
Soviet military personnel of World War II
Recipients of the Order of Lenin
Recipients of the Order of the Red Banner
Recipients of the Order of Suvorov, 2nd class
Burials at Novodevichy Cemetery